Skryabin, Skrjabin; Scriabine or Scriabin may refer to

Skryabin (surname)
 Skryabin (band), a Ukrainian pop/rock band
 6549 Skryabin, a main-belt asteroid named after Alexander Scriabin